Cnemaspis omari is a species of gecko. It is known from near the Thai-Malaysian border in Perlis State of Malaysia and Satun Province of Thailand.

References

Further reading

Amarasinghe, AA Thasun, et al. "A New Species of Cnemaspis (Reptilia: Gekkonidae) from Sumatra, Indonesia." Herpetologica 71.2 (2015): 160–167.
PAUWELS, OLIVIER SG, and L. LEE GRISMER. "A Field Guide to the Reptiles of Thailand." Herpetological Review 46.3 (2015): 456–459.

Cnemaspis
Reptiles of Malaysia
Reptiles of Thailand
Reptiles described in 2014